NH 77 may refer to:

 National Highway 77 (India)
 New Hampshire Route 77, United States